is a Japanese footballer who plays for Tochigi Uva FC.

Club statistics
Updated to 23 February 2018.

References

External links

Profile at Tokushima Vortis

1989 births
Living people
Association football people from Tokyo
Japanese footballers
J1 League players
J2 League players
Ventforet Kofu players
Kataller Toyama players
Tokushima Vortis players
Tochigi City FC players
Association football midfielders